Cold is a song by American singer-songwriter Chris Stapleton, it was released on September 25, 2020 as the third single from his fourth studio album Starting Over. At the 64th Grammy Awards, the song won the award for Best Country Song.

Live performance
On November 10, 2021, Stapleton performed the song on 55th CMA Awards, on April 3, 2022, he performed on the 64th Grammy Awards.

Charts

Weekly charts

Year-end charts

Certifications

References

2020 songs
Chris Stapleton songs
Songs written by Chris Stapleton
Song recordings produced by Dave Cobb